No More Drama is the fifth studio album by American singer Mary J. Blige, released on August 28, 2001, by MCA Records.

Following the critical and commercial success of her fourth studio album, Mary (1999), No More Drama was similarly well received. It debuted at number two on the US Billboard 200 and at number one on the R&B Albums chart, selling 294,000 copies in its first week. It has spawned four singles that have attained Billboard chart success, including its lead single "Family Affair", which became Blige's first career number-one single on the US Billboard Hot 100 chart and a worldwide number-one hit.

The album received two Grammy Award nominations for Best R&B Album and Best Female R&B Vocal Performance (for "Family Affair") at the 44th Grammy Awards. Blige would win her first in the latter category for the track "He Think I Don't Know" the following year. As of December 2016, the album has been certified triple platinum for shipping over three million copies in the US by the Recording Industry Association of America (RIAA).

Conception
The inspiration for No More Drama came largely from Blige's own confused and hectic life. In a later interview she confessed to living a life of alcohol and drug abuse at the time, and as a result getting involved in a series of abusive relationships. The album was an attempt to break free from this vicious circle, which was a result of a deprived childhood.

Stylistically, the album diverged from the blues-soaked R&B of Mary into her earlier 1990s hip-hop beats. This is especially evident in the first single, "Family Affair". Rapper Eve appears on the track "Where I've Been" as well, and urban influences can be heard throughout the album.

Early in its development, the album carried the full title Mary Jane: No More Drama and was to be a sequel to 1999's Mary. Blige's then-manager hinted that the album would be the second in a trilogy and be followed by an album titled Mary Jane Blige. During this time, the first single was supposed to be a song called "Rock Steady" featuring a rap from Jay-Z and Lenny Kravitz on guitar. The song was leaked to mixtapes around June 2001, two months before the album was scheduled to be released and subsequently did not make the final cut on the album.

The original advance copy of No More Drama was slightly different from the later, official release. A vocal loop repeated throughout the whole of the version included with the intention of anti-piracy sings "Mary J. Blige, No More Drama!". The first publish of an AMG review printed in All Music Guide to Soul, a guide to R&B and soul, of No More Drama mistakenly pointed this out as if it were part of the actual album, calling it "as subtle and congruent as a consistent drum hit."

Critical reception

No More Drama received generally positive reviews from critics. At Metacritic, which assigns a normalized rating out of 100 to reviews from mainstream publications, the album received an average score of 77, based on 12 reviews. AllMusic editor Liana Jonas complimented Blige's ability to write relatable lyrics, writing that she "has a killer instinct for creating gritty, thick, and soul-infused R&B fare. Her music is more than heard. It is felt, and audiences would be hard-pressed to not surrender to her groove." Writing for The A.V. Club, Nathan Rabin believed "Blige sounds happier and more relaxed than ever. Boasting nearly as many producers as songs, No More Drama [is] a testament to Blige's force of personality and the authenticity of her vision that the disc feels as personal and intimate as the most heartfelt four-track demo." Entertainment Weeklys David Browne felt that "from the Dre-produced theatricality of the single ”Family Affair” to refined funk and crisp quiet-storm R&B, the multi-producer arrangements are expansive yet warm, and Blige's pushy rasp has never sounded better." Robert Marriott from Rolling Stone said the record "presents Blige more in touch with her roots, more grounded and ready for her next set of challenges, musical and otherwise, an analog soul thriving in a digital age." Barry Walters from The Village Voice called it "Blige's most rhythm album ever, and even the ballads that can drag r&b down here bristle with bumping beats."

The newspaper's Robert Christgau was somewhat less enthusiastic, finding the record "front-loaded", highlighting the songs "PMS" and "Steal Away" while writing "positive attitude's a bitch, not to mention a drag". Ethan Brown was unimpressed by Blige's more optimistic songs, writing in New York magazine that, "miserable, Blige can be penetrating and profound; happy, she comes off generic and bland."

Commercial performance
 
No More Drama debuted and peaked at number two on the Billboard 200, the official albums chart in the United States, on September 6, 2001 – second only to Aaliyah's self-titled third album. The album sold 294,351 units in its first week of release. No More Drama was Blige's highest debut week album sales, until it was surpassed by The Breakthrough (2005), which sold 729,000 copies in its first week. By the end of 2001, the album was certified platinum by the Recording Industry Association of America (RIAA), and became the seventy-third best-selling album of that year in the United States. The album's commercial performance was reinforced by the subsequent release of a reissue. The release of the special edition helped No More Drama to re-enter the top ten in February 2002, gaining more than 200 percent in sales at a total of 61,000 copies. The same month, No More Drama was certified double platinum by the RIAA. As of August 2003, the album has sold 1.9 million copies in the US, while the special edition moved an additional 1.1 million units.

In Germany, the album was her most successful one in her career in this country, reaching #13 and staying in the German Albums Chart for 35 weeks 
Estimated worldwide sales for the album are at 6,500,000.

Track listing

Sample credits
 "PMS" contains a sample of "Simply Beautiful" (1972), written and performed by Al Green.
 "No More Drama" embodies portions of "The Young and the Restless Theme" (1971), written by Barry De Vorzon and Perry Botkin Jr.
 "Dance for Me" contains a sample of "The Bed's Too Big Without You" (1979), written by Sting and performed by the Police.
 "Flying Away" contains a sample of "God Bless You" (1979), written and performed by Brenda Russell.
 "Never Been" contains a sample of "Why Oh Why" (1980), written and performed by McFadden & Whitehead.
 "No More Drama" (Remix) contains excerpts and samples from "You Can't Do It Alone" (1980), written by Bernard Edwards and Nile Rodgers and performed by Chic.

Charts

Weekly charts

Year-end charts

Certifications

References

External links

2001 albums
2002 albums
Albums produced by Dr. Dre
Albums produced by Irv Gotti
Albums produced by Jimmy Jam and Terry Lewis
Albums produced by Missy Elliott
Albums produced by the Neptunes
Albums produced by Rockwilder
Albums produced by Rich Harrison
Albums produced by Swizz Beatz
Mary J. Blige albums
MCA Records albums
Interscope Geffen A&M Records albums
Albums produced by Dame Grease